Silvia Torras (1936–1970) was a Catalan informalist painter. Torras became a notable artist in the Argentine informalism movement and showed her work in several major exhibits during the short period she painted.

Life 
Torras was born in 1936 in Barcelona, Spain. She had a twin sister and three other siblings. Her father had spent time in Argentina prior to marriage, and the family moved to Buenos Aires before Torras was a year old. Torras was raised in Argentina, and that is where she studied as an artist.

Torras married Kenneth Kemble, an artist under whom she trained in Argentina. The two later divorced, and Torras married George Manning, Jr. After her marriage to Manning, she moved with him and their stepchildren to Peru. She and Manning had one child together. Torras died of cancer in Mexico in 1970.

Painting 

She continued her training beginning in 1956 with artist Kenneth Kemble, whom she later married.

Torras became a figure within the Argentine informalism movement of the time. She tended to produce large pieces (around ) reflecting an abstract expressionism. Her themes of organic vegetation and nature references, strong brushstrokes and layered paint, and use of colour differentiated her from others in the informalism movement. She typically would not title her works, or titled them only with names of colours. She produced most of her work between the years of 1960 and 1963. In 1963, she gave up painting and moved to Mexico, where she briefly taught art in San Miguel De Allende. El Gran Otro wrote that Torras's "works were developed in a short period of time but with overwhelming force."

Many years after her death, Torras's paintings resurfaced and were put on exhibit in Buenos Aires.

Exhibitions 

 1960 – Individual exhibition, Galería Peuser
 1961 – Individual exhibition,  
 1961 – Arte Destructivo ("Destructive Art"), Galería Lirolay 
 1962 – Premio Ver y Estimar, honourable mention, Museo Nacional de Bellas Artes, Buenos Aires, Argentina
 1963 – Premio Ver y Estimar, participant, Museo Nacional de Bellas Artes, Buenos Aires, Argentina 
 1963 – Premio Di Tella (Di Tella award), participant
 1963 – Arte Argentino Actual ("Contemporary Argentine Art"), Musée d'Art Moderne, Paris, France

Posthumous 

 1979 – Love Story: Silvia Torras y Kenneth Kemble, Galería Van Riel, Buenos Aires, Argentina
 2002 –  Kemble/Torras, Museo Nacional de Bellas Artes, Buenos Aires, Argentina
 2018 – Silvia Torras. Resplandor 1960–63, Eduardo Sívori Museum, Buenos Aires, Argentina
2021- Silvia Torras. Juventud y Alegría - MCMC Galeria, Buenos Aires, Argentina
2022 - Kenneth Kemble and Silvia Torras: The Formative Years, Duke House Exhibition, New York, New York<ref name=":9" <ref name=":10"

References 

1936 births
1970 deaths
20th-century Argentine painters
20th-century Catalan painters
20th-century women artists
Argentine women painters
Art Informel and Tachisme painters
Artists from Buenos Aires
Educators from Catalonia
Women artists from Catalonia
Deaths from cancer in Mexico
Spanish contemporary artists
20th-century Spanish women